The 1980–81 Rugby Football League season was the 86th season of professional rugby league football in Britain. Sixteen teams competed from August 1980 until May 1981 for the Slalom Lager Championship.

Season summary
Slalom Lager League Champions: Bradford Northern
Challenge Cup Winners: Widnes (18-9 v Hull Kingston Rovers)
Slalom Lager Premiership Trophy Winners: Hull Kingston Rovers (11-7 v Hull)
John Player Special Trophy Winners: Warrington (12-5 v Barrow)
2nd Division Champions: York

For the only time in their history, Wigan competed outside the top flight of Rugby League in this season.
Fulham RLFC joined the competition in Division Two, later becoming the London Crusaders, London Broncos (twice), and Harlequins Rugby League.

Bradford Northern finished on top of the First Division table to claim their second championship, and Hull Kingston Rovers won the Rugby League Premiership competition.

Warrington beat Wigan 26–10 to win the Lancashire County Cup, and Leeds beat Hull Kingston Rovers 8–7 to win the Yorkshire County Cup.

League Tables

Championship
Final Standings

Second Division

Challenge Cup

The 1980–81 State Express Challenge Cup was won by Widnes after defeating Hull Kingston Rovers 18–9 in the final.

The Final was played at Wembley before a crowd of 92,496.

League Cup

Warrington won the John Player Trophy for the third time in their history, beating Barrow 12–5 at Central Park, Wigan.

Premiership

Hull Kingston Rovers won the Premiership competition for the first time, defeating local rivals Hull 11–7 at Headingley, Leeds.

New Zealand Kiwis Tour

September until November also saw the appearance of the New Zealand team in England on their 1980 tour. Other than the three test series against Great Britain, The Kiwis played matches club and county sides.

The 1980 Kiwis were coached by Ces Mountford and were captained by Mark Graham.

Dane O'Hara, who would join Hull F.C. following the tour was the leading try scorer with 6. Scrum half Gordon Smith (who would join Hull Kingston Rovers in 1982) was the tours leading point scorer with 33 from 1 try and 15 goals.

Statistics
The following are the top points scorers in all competitions in the 1980–81 season.

Most tries

Most goals (including drop goals)

Notes

Sources
 
1980-81 Rugby Football League season at wigan.rlfans.com

1980 in English rugby league
1981 in English rugby league
Rugby Football League seasons